Håkon P. Bryhn (14 August 1901 – 15 December 1968) was a Norwegian sailor who competed in the 1928 Summer Olympics.

In 1928 he won the gold medal as crew member of the Norwegian boat Norna in the 6 metre class event.

References 
 

1901 births
1968 deaths
Norwegian male sailors (sport)
Olympic sailors of Norway
Sailors at the 1928 Summer Olympics – 6 Metre
Olympic gold medalists for Norway
Olympic medalists in sailing

Medalists at the 1928 Summer Olympics